Windows Mobile 2003, originally codenamed "Ozone", was a member of the Windows Mobile family of mobile operating systems, released on June 23, 2003. It was the first Microsoft mobile OS to be called "Windows Mobile" and was based on Windows CE 4.20.

Editions
Windows Mobile 2003 came in four editions:
 Windows Mobile 2003 for Pocket PC Premium Edition
 Windows Mobile 2003 for Pocket PC Professional Edition: Used in Pocket PC budget models and lacked a number of features from the Premium Edition such as a client for L2TP/IPsec VPN.
 Windows Mobile 2003 for Smartphones
 Windows Mobile 2003 for Pocket PC Phone Edition: Designed especially for Pocket PCs which include phone functionality.

Features
The communications interface was enhanced with Bluetooth device management which allowed for Bluetooth file transfer support, Bluetooth headset support and support for Bluetooth add-on keyboards.

A pictures application with viewing, cropping, e-mail, and beaming support was added.

Multimedia improvements included MIDI file support as ringtones in Phone Edition and Windows Media Player 9.0 with streaming optimization.

A puzzle game titled Jawbreaker was among the pre-installed programs. Games API was included with this release to facilitate the development of games for the platform.

Other features/built-in applications included:
 Enhanced Pocket Outlook with vCard and vCal support
 Improved Pocket Internet Explorer
 SMS reply options for Phone Edition.

See also

References 

Windows Mobile
Discontinued versions of Microsoft Windows